Guyjeh Ali Aslan (also Romanized as Gūyjeh ʿAlī Aşlān; also known as Gūyjehlū-ye Aşlān) is a village in Bash Qaleh Rural District, in the Central District of Urmia County, West Azerbaijan Province, Iran. At the 2006 census, its population was 127, in 38 families.

References 

Populated places in Urmia County